Wallace Gilberry (born December 5, 1984) is a former American football defensive end. He was signed by the New York Giants as an undrafted free agent in 2008. He played college football at Alabama.

Gilberry has also played for the Kansas City Chiefs, Tampa Bay Buccaneers, Detroit Lions and finished his career with the Cincinnati Bengals.

Early years
Gilberry played his prep football at Baldwin County High School. In his junior season, Gilberry played primarily tight end where he started the last seven games. As a senior at defensive end, he made 61 solo tackles, 16 assists, seven sacks, seven tackles for losses, and deflected six passes. He also caused two fumbles, recovering both.

College career
Gilberry attended the University of Alabama, where he was redshirted in 2003. He played from 2004-2007. He appeared in 50 games. He became a starter during his sophomore year.

He finished his career at Alabama with 188 tackles, 60.5 tackles for loss for -223 yards, 21.5 sacks for -135 yards, 5 forced fumbles, 3 fumble recoveries and 38 quarterback hurries.

He was a first-team selection to the All-SEC Coaches’ Football Team in 2007.

While at the University of Alabama, Gilberry was initiated into the Omega Psi Phi fraternity's Beta Eta chapter in the Fall of 2004.

Professional career

New York Giants
Gilberry was signed by the New York Giants as an undrafted free agent in 2008, but was released by the team before the regular season began.

Kansas City Chiefs
Gilberry was signed to the Chiefs in August 2008. He made his NFL debut against the San Diego Chargers on November 9, recording one tackle.

In 2009, he had 20 tackles, two assists, and 4.5 sacks.

In 2010, Gilberry had 3 sacks in one game against the St. Louis Rams. In 2011, Gilberry forced a fumble on Tom Brady after coming from behind and tackling him, and recovered the football. After the 2011 NFL season, Gilberry was not offered a contract.

Tampa Bay Buccaneers
Gilberry signed with the Tampa Bay Buccaneers on June 4, 2012. He was released by the team on September 14.

Cincinnati Bengals
Gilberry signed with the Cincinnati Bengals on September 18, 2012. On December 13, 2012, Gilberry recovered a fumble and ran into the endzone for his first career touchdown against the Philadelphia Eagles.

In 2012, he played in 14 games and accumulated a total of 24 tackles 15 solo and 9 assisted, 6.5 sacks a forced fumble and 3 fumble returns.

On March 12, 2013, he re-signed with the Bengals on a three-year, $6.75 million deal.

So far as of week 4 of the 2013 season, he has accumulated a total of 4 tackles 3 solo and 1 assisted and 0.5 sacks.

Detroit Lions
On April 4, 2016, Gilberry signed a one-year contract with the Detroit Lions. On October 4, 2016, he was placed on injured reserve with an abdomen injury. He was released by the team on October 11, 2016.

Second stint with Bengals
On November 7, 2016, Gilberry re-signed with the Bengals.

On March 24, 2017, Gilberry signed a one-year contract to remain with the Bengals. He was released on September 2, 2017.

On December 15, 2017, Gilberry announced his retirement from the NFL.

References

External links
Alabama Crimson Tide bio
Kansas City Chiefs bio
New York Giants bio
Tampa Bay Buccaneers Bio
Cincinnati Bengals Bio

1984 births
Living people
People from Bay Minette, Alabama
American football defensive ends
Alabama Crimson Tide football players
New York Giants players
Kansas City Chiefs players
Tampa Bay Buccaneers players
Cincinnati Bengals players
Detroit Lions players